Only with Married Men is a 1974 American made-for-television comedy film directed by Jerry Paris.

Plot
A girl decides to only date married men. A man falls in love with her and pretends to be married to woo her.

Cast
David Birney as Dave Andrews
Michele Lee as Jill Garrett
John Astin as Dr Harvey Osterman
Judy Carne as Marge West
Dom DeLuise as Murray West
Gavin MacLeod as Jordan Robbins
Dan Tobin as Alan Tolan
Simone Griffeth asTina
Yolanda Galardo as Sheila Osterman

Reception
The Los Angeles Times called it "witless".

References

External links
Only with Married Men at TCMDB
Only with Married Men at IMDb

1974 television films
1974 films
ABC Movie of the Week
Films directed by Jerry Paris
Films scored by Jack Elliott
1970s English-language films